The Berkuts (English: Golden eagles) are a Soviet and later Russian aerobatic performance demonstrator team connected with the Russian Air Force.

History 
The Berkuti were founded as a helicopter aerobatic team in 1992 and used first four, later six, Mil Mi-24 of different versions. The helicopters were painted in the usual camouflage colors, however, had at the height of the cockpit starting a lightning-shaped strip of over the whole length of the hull in the Russian national colors (White, Blue, Red). And on the righthand side area of the cockpit the team emblem.
The Berkuti changed to six Mil Mi-28N combat helicopters. On August 2 2015 at the end of the flight demonstration at Ryazan a helicopter of the Berkuti teams crashed down and caught fire. One pilot was rescued while the other pilot was killed. The reason for failure was seen in the hydraulic system and led to a temporarily grounding of the whole Mi-28 fleet. However, already at the MAKS Airshow end of August 2015, the team showed again its air display show.
The three teams Berkuti, Russian Knights/Russkiye Vityazi and Swifts/Strizhi belong to the standard teams at the MAKS (air show) and the victory parades in Moscow.

See also
 Soviet air shows

References

External links

  Berkuti mit Mi-24 2007 in Monino
 Absturz Mi-28

Units and formations of the Russian Air Force
Units and formations of the Soviet Air Forces
Aerobatic teams
1991 establishments in the Soviet Union
Russian ceremonial units